Tebbs is a name. Notable people with this name include:

 Barry Tebb
 Betty Tebbs (1918–2017), English activist
 Francis Tebbs Havergal (1829–1890)
 James Tebbs (1878–1901), English football player
 Reginald Tebbs (1908–1973), English cricket player
 Tebbs Lloyd Johnson (1900–1984), British speed-walker
 William H. Tebbs (1821–1866), American politician
 Sophie Tebbs (1998-Present), Aspiring structural engineer